Body High is the second mixtape by American hip hop recording artist Lucki. It was released on August 7, 2014 as a free digital download.

Track listing

2014 mixtape albums
Lucki albums